Christos Arinoutsos (born 25 May 1993) is a Greek footballer who plays for A.E. Parou as a midfielder.

Club career
At the age of 15 Christos Arianoutsos was discovered by Olympiacos scouters and he was signed by the club where he spent 3 years.
He started his professional career in 2011 when he was signed by his former youth manager Alekos Alexandris to play for PO Elassona in the Greek Delta Ethniki. The next two seasons found him play for Pannaxiakos in Football League 2. After 2 full seasons in Naxos he made a bigger step in his career signing for Kallithea to play in the Football League.

International career
Arianoutsos was a regular player of the Greek national youth sides. He captained Greece U-17 in the 2010 UEFA European Under-17 Championship.

External links
 https://web.archive.org/web/20150109094934/http://www.epae.org/player.fds?categ=2&team=44&player=14368&pagecode=04.02.02&langid=1
 http://sportcyclades.gr/index.php?option=com_k2&view=item&id=12615:%CF%83%CF%84%CE%B7%CE%BD-%CE%BA%CE%B1%CE%BB%CE%BB%CE%B9%CE%B8%CE%AD%CE%B1-%CE%BF-%CE%B1%CF%81%CE%B9%CE%B1%CE%BD%CE%BF%CF%8D%CF%84%CF%83%CE%BF%CF%82&Itemid=53

1993 births
Living people
People from Paros
Greek footballers
Greek expatriate footballers
Association football midfielders
Kallithea F.C. players
Sportspeople from the South Aegean